48th Division or 48th Infantry Division may refer to:

Infantry divisions
 48th Infantry Division (1st Formation)(People's Republic of China)
 48th Reserve Division (German Empire)

 48th Infantry Division (Wehrmacht), Germany
 48th Infantry Division Taro, Kingdom of Italy
 48th Division (Imperial Japanese Army)
 48th Infantry Division (Russian Empire)
48th Rifle Division, Soviet Union
 48th (South Midland) Division, United Kingdom
 48th Infantry Division (United States), a phantom unit

Other divisions
 48th Armored Division, United States